Caligula jonasi, the jonasi silkmoth, is a moth of the family Saturniidae. It was described by Arthur Gardiner Butler in 1877. It is found in Japan, China and the Korean Peninsula.

Adults are on wing from October to April.

The larvae feed on chestnut, willow, apple, hawthorn, oak and poplar. Larvae have urticating hairs which can cause a rash to the skin.

External links
Species info

Caligula (moth)
Moths described in 1877
Moths of Asia
Moths of Japan
Moths of Korea
Taxa named by Arthur Gardiner Butler